Jalan Pedas–Linggi (Negeri Sembilan state route N9) is a major road in Negeri Sembilan, Malaysia. It is also a main route to North–South Expressway Southern Route via Pedas/Linggi Interchange.

List of junctions

References 

Roads in Negeri Sembilan